Aurelia Neapolis, or Neapolis, was an inland town of ancient Caria, between Orthosia and Aphrodisias, at the foot of Mount Cadmus, in the neighbourhood of Harpasa. During Roman times, it bore the name of Aurelia Neapolis.

Its site is located near modern Inebolu, Turkey.

References

Populated places in ancient Caria
Former populated places in Turkey
History of Aydın Province